Camille Vallin (22 November 1918, in Givors – 9 August 2009) was a French politician. He represented the French Communist Party in the National Assembly from 1956 to 1958 and in the Senate from 1959 to 1968 and from 1977 to 1986. He was the mayor of Givors from 1953 to 1993.

See also

References

1918 births
2009 deaths
People from Givors
Mayors of places in Auvergne-Rhône-Alpes
French Communist Party politicians
Deputies of the 3rd National Assembly of the French Fourth Republic
French Senators of the Fifth Republic
Senators of Rhône (department)
French military personnel of World War II
Communist members of the French Resistance